Maria Verelst (1680–1744) was an 18th-century English painter.

Biography
Verelst was born in Vienna, but moved with her family to London at the age of three. Her father was the Dutch painter Harman Verelst, who taught her and her brothers Simon and Cornelis how to paint. She is known for miniatures and portraits as well as becoming a language teacher. She spoke many different languages such as Dutch and Latin.

According to the Dutch artist biographer Jacob Campo Weyerman, she overheard some Dutch men in a London theatre speaking about artists in their native language and she corrected them. The gentlemen excused themselves and continued speaking in Italian. She corrected them again, and they continued in Latin with the remark that they would not be interrupted in that language again. When she again spoke, it was to insist that women could not be barred from learning languages, despite the fact that they were not allowed to participate in public proceedings. The gentlemen were so impressed they inquired of her occupation and came to visit her the next day bearing gifts and to order their portraits made.

Career 
Her earliest paintings have not survived. In the 1720s she worked with William Aikman and Charles Jervas but her style more closely reflected Thomas Hudson by the next decade. Landscape backgrounds and informal dress were her style of choice for the majority of her female subjects. Hayes notes that while her modeling is firm, her staging of drapery is simple.

She also worked with Sir James Thornhill around this same period of time. Murals have been preserved in England that have been attributed as a joint effort between the two painters.

Works 
Some of her works include: Portrait of Lady Smythe, three-quarter-length, Portrait of a lady, half-length, in a silver white gown, Nature morte aux huitres et aux crabs, Portrait of Duke of Marlborough, Portrait of a woman, Lady Middleton, Portrait of a lady in a yellow dress seated, with a wooded landscape beyond, Portrait of a Lady with a Country Estate in the Distance, and Duke of Chandos in the dressing room.

Family Tree

End of Life 
She died in London in 1744, nearly 40 years after her father, and 20 years after her uncle. Both of whom were accomplished painters and her earliest mentors.

References

External links

 Painting by Maria Verelst of Sarah Churchill, Duchess of Marlborough on website of the Wallace Collection
 Maria Verelst on Artnet

1680 births
1744 deaths
18th-century English painters
18th-century English women artists
Artists from Vienna
English women painters
English people of Dutch descent